The Big Trip (also released as The Big Trip 3D and Mission: Panda) is a 2019 Russian computer-animated adventure comedy film directed by Vasily Rovensky (who also acted as a writer and producer) and Natalya Nilova. The plot concerns a bear and a hare who must return a baby panda to its rightful parents after a stork mistakenly delivers it to them instead. The film was released in Russia on 27 April 2019, and was a commercial success, but received mixed to negative reviews worldwide.

Premise 
When a stork accidentally delivers a panda cub to the wrong parents, which leads bear Mic-Mic and hare Oscar to take the panda to its rightful parents. Along their journey, they meet several animals.

Voice cast 
Dmitry Nazarov as Mic-Mic the grumpy Asiatic black bear
Maxim Galkin as Oscar the talkative hare
Vasily Rovensky Jr. as baby panda
Philip Kirkorov as Duke the clumsy pelican
Diomid Vinogradov as Janus the cowardly wolf, Father panda, and a trio of Golden snub-nosed monkeys
Alexey Vorobyov as Amur the poetic Siberian tiger
Tatiana Navka as Mother panda
Irina Kireeva as the red squirrel and duck #1
Anastasia Reshetnikova as duck #2
Sergey Smirnov as Carl the stork, mole and Phyton the evil Reticulated Python
Vasily Rovensky as the storks and Houston the insane moose

English Dub Cast
Daniel Medvedev as Mic-Mic, Janus, Janus' Fear
Pauly Shore as Mic-Mic (redub)
Stephen Thomas Ochsner as Oscar, Duke
Drake Bell as Oscar (redub)
Timothy John Joseph Sell as Amur
Bernard Carl Jacobsen as Mr. Panda
Katherine Marie Rommel as Mrs. Panda
Brodey Evan Milburn as Python and Houston
David Andrew Grout as Mole Stevie Rai, Carl
Jonathan Salway as Cameo Role Characters

Release 
The film had its world premiere in Turkey on 12 April 2019, and was released theatrically in Russia on 27 April. It was a commercial success, grossing $2.2 million in Russia and $7.1 million worldwide. The top earning European country was the Netherlands with $1.8 million. The film was released on DVD in the United States by Lionsgate on January 14, 2020, with an English dub featuring Pauly Shore and Drake Bell in the main roles.

Sequel 
A sequel, titled The Big Trip: Special Delivery, was released on 13 October 2021 in Russia. Lionsgate has acquired US distribution rights, and plans to release the film in American theatres in 2022. Pauly Shore reprises his role as Mic-Mic in the Lionsgate dub, while Jesse McCartney replaces Drake Bell as Oscar.

References

External links 

The Big Trip at Film.ru, a Russian film database (in Russian)

2019 computer-animated films
2019 films
Animated adventure films
Animated comedy films
Animated films about animals
Animated films about bears
Fictional wolves
Films about babies
Films about giant pandas
Films about snakes
Films about tigers
Russian animated films
Russian children's films
2010s Russian-language films